Grady is an unincorporated community in Montgomery County, Alabama, United States. It is at the intersection of Montgomery County Road 28 (Meriwether Trail) and Montgomery County Road 1 (Ramer-Grady Road).

Grady is named in honor of Henry W. Grady.

A US Postal Office is in Grady. Its ZIP code is 36036. A post office first began operating under the name Grady in 1890.

Notable people
 Tracy Harris Patterson, former two weight world champion boxer
 Ike Zimmerman, blues guitarist, who is now known to have been musician Robert Johnson's main guitar teacher

References

     

Unincorporated communities in Montgomery County, Alabama
Unincorporated communities in Alabama